The MacGregor 25 is an American trailerable sailboat, that was designed by Roger MacGregor and first built in 1973. From the start of production until 1980 it was sold as the Venture 25.

Production
The boat was built by MacGregor Yacht Corporation in the United States between 1973 and 1987, but it is now out of production. During its 14-year production run 7,000 examples were completed.

Design

The MacGregor 25 is a small recreational keelboat, built predominantly of fiberglass, with wood trim. It has a fractional sloop masthead sloop rig, a transom-hung rudder and a fixed stub keel with a centerboard. It displaces  and carries  of ballast.

Starting in 1980, a number of boats were built with a masthead sloop rig, and known as the MacGregor 25 MH.

The boat is normally fitted with a small  outboard motor for docking and maneuvering.

The design has sleeping accommodation for five people, with a double "V"-berth in the bow cabin, a straight settee in the main cabin on the port side and drop-down dinette table on the starboard side that forms a double berth. The galley is located on the port side just forward of the companionway ladder. The galley is equipped with a two-burner stove and a sink. The head is located just aft of the bow cabin on the starboard side.

The masthead rigged version has a PHRF racing average handicap of 231 with a high of 246 and low of 222.

Operational history
In a 2010 review Steve Henkel wrote, "this popular design started out as the Venture 25 in 1973, and in 1981 became the MacGregor 25, with no major changes to the design. Over the years there was a choice of two sailplans, either a three quarters fractional rig or a masthead rig ... The boat is lightly built and has ample sail area (note the higher SA/D versus comps) so she will have a good turn of speed if properly equipped and tuned."

American Sailboat Hall of Fame
The MacGregor 25 was inducted into the now-defunct Sail America American Sailboat Hall of Fame in 2000. In honoring the design, the hall cited, "Henry Ford is often credited with bringing the automobile to the common man. Roger MacGregor, a one-time Ford employee, may well be credited with doing the same thing for the cruising sailboat. The popular MacGregor 25 was the flagship of his line for 14 years. With a swinging keel - a MacGregor invention - that made transporting and launching the boat a snap, and a price that hovered around the cost of a new car, the MacGregor 25 opened up coastal and inland sailing to thousands."

See also
List of sailing boat types

Related development
MacGregor 26

Similar sailboats
Beachcomber 25
Bayfield 25
Beneteau First 25.7
Beneteau First 25S
Beneteau First 260 Spirit
Bombardier 7.6
C&C 25
Cal 25
Cal 2-25
Capri 25
Catalina 25
Catalina 250
Com-Pac 25
Dufour 1800
Freedom 25
Hunter 25
Hunter 25.5
Jouët 760
Kelt 7.6
Kirby 25
Merit 25
Mirage 25
Northern 25
O'Day 25
Redline 25
Sirius 26
Tanzer 25
US Yachts US 25
Watkins 25

References

External links

Keelboats
1970s sailboat type designs
Sailing yachts
Trailer sailers
Sailboat type designs by Roger MacGregor
Sailboat types built by the MacGregor Yacht Corporation